The 1896 United States presidential election in Montana took place on November 3, 1896 as part of the 1896 United States presidential election. Voters chose three representatives, or electors to the Electoral College, who voted for president and vice president.

Montana overwhelmingly voted for the Democratic nominee, former U.S. Representative from Nebraska William Jennings Bryan over the Republican nominee, former governor of Ohio William McKinley. Bryan won the state by a landslide margin of 60.22 percentage points. To date this is the best performance ever by a presidential candidate in Montana. 

Bryan's support for many Populist goals resulted in him being nominated by both the Democratic Party and the People's Party (Populists), though with different running mates.  One electoral vote from Montana was cast for the Populist Bryan-Watson ticket with Thomas E. Watson as Vice-President and two votes were cast for the Bryan-Sewall ticket.

Bryan would later beat McKinley in the state again four years later but would lose the state to William Howard Taft in 1908.

McKinley is the only Republican to win the White House without carrying Yellowstone County.

Results

Results by county

See also
 United States presidential elections in Montana

References

Montana
1896
1896 Montana elections